Chun-hee, also spelled Chun-hui, is a Korean unisex given name. Its meaning depends on the hanja used to write each syllable of the name. There are four hanja with the reading "chun" (among them one common one meaning "spring";) and 24 hanja with the reading "hee" on the South Korean government's official list of hanja which may be used in given names. 

People with this name include:

Ri Chun-hee (born 1943), retired female North Korean news anchor
Kim Chun-hui (born 1963), South Korean female discus thrower
Jong Chun-hui (born 1998), North Korean female weightlifter
Lee Choon-hee, South Korean male politician, mayor of Sejong City

See also
List of Korean given names
Lee Chun-hee (born 1979), South Korean male actor

References

Korean unisex given names